John "Jack" Shaffery (1874 – 1934) was an English footballer who played in the Football League for Stoke.

Career
Shaffery was born in Stoke-upon-Trent and played amateur football with Northwood before joining Stoke in 1897. He played in five matches for the "Potters" during the 1897–98 season before returning to amateur status with Hanley Swifts.

Career statistics

References

English footballers
Stoke City F.C. players
English Football League players
1874 births
1934 deaths
Association football outside forwards